The 2019–20 Cal State Fullerton Titans men's basketball team represented California State University, Fullerton in the 2019–20 NCAA Division I men's basketball season. The Titans, led by seventh-year head coach Dedrique Taylor, played their home games at the Titan Gym in Fullerton, California as members of the Big West Conference. They finished the season 11–20, 6–10 in Big West play to finish in a tie for seventh place. They were set to be the No. 7 seed in the Big West tournament. However, the Big West tournament was canceled amid the COVID-19 pandemic.

Previous season
The Titans finished the 2018–19 season 16–18 overall, 10–6 in Big West play, finishing in a tie for 2nd place. In the Big West tournament, they defeated UC Davis in the quarterfinals, and UC Santa Barbara in the semifinals, advancing to the championship game against top-seeded UC Irvine, in an attempt to reach the NCAA tournament for the second successive year; however, the Titans were handily defeated by the Anteaters, 92–64, in a rematch of the previous year's championship. They were invited to the CIT, where they fell to Cal State Bakersfield in the first round.

Roster

Schedule and results

|-
!colspan=12 style=| Exhibition

|-
!colspan=12 style=| Non-conference regular season

|-
!colspan=9 style=| Big West regular season

|-
!colspan=12 style=| Big West tournament
|-

|-

Source

References

Cal State Fullerton Titans men's basketball seasons
Cal State Fullerton Titans
Cal State Fullerton Titans men's basketball
Cal State Fullerton Titans men's basketball